The Sitilink or Surat BRTS is an integrated bus rapid transit and public bus transport system for Surat, Gujarat, India. It has been operational since 26 January, 2014 by Surat Municipal Corporation.

Corridors

Phase 1
The Two corridors have been completed in Phase 1.
 Corridor 1: Udhana Darwaja to Sachin GIDC Naka [10.20 km]
 Corridor 2: ONGC Colony - Canal Road - Sarthana Jakat Naka [19.70 km]

Phase 2
Phase 2 consists of nine corridors, out of which most of the corridors have already been completed.
 Corridor 3: Adajan Patiya to Jahangirpura
 Corridor 4: Adajan Patiya to Pal R.T.O.
 Corridor 5: Pal R.T.O. to ONGC Colony
 Corridor 6: Anuvrat Dwar to St. Thomas School Junction
 Corridor 7: St. Thomas School Junction to Daksheshwar Mahadev Junction (Connect to Phase-I)
 Corridor 8: Dindoli Varigruh to Hirabaug/Gajera Circle 
 Corridor 9: Hirabaug to Lake Garden
 Corridor 10: Gajera Circle to Jahangirpura
 Corridor 11: Katargam Darwaja to Kosad

Routes

See also
List of tourist attractions in Surat

References

Bus rapid transit in India
Transport in Surat
2013 establishments in Gujarat